Michael Skerrett (died 1785) was an Irish clergyman of the Roman Catholic Church. He served as Archbishop of Tuam from 1749 to 1785.

He was appointed Bishop of Killala on 23 January 1749, but was quickly translated to the archbishopric of Tuam on 5 May 1749. He died in office on 19 August 1785.

He was a descendant of the Tribes of Galway.

References

1785 deaths
Christian clergy from County Mayo
Roman Catholic bishops of Killala
Roman Catholic archbishops of Tuam
Year of birth unknown